NUAK family SNF1-like kinase 2 also known as SNF1/AMP kinase-related kinase (SNARK) is an enzyme that in humans is encoded by the NUAK2 gene. It's deficiency in humans causes anencephaly, a severe form of anterior neural tube defect that curtails brain development.

References

Further reading

EC 2.7.11